The Law of Men may refer to:

 The Law of Men (1919 film)
 The Law of Men (1962 film)